The Girl from Oslo is a 2021 Israeli-Norwegian Netflix thriller series starring Anneke von der Lippe, Amos Tamam, and Raida Adon. It is co-directed by Uri Barbash and Stian Kristiansen The series is called Bortført in Norway.

Synopsis
While on vacation in the Sinai desert, Pia, a Norwegian girl, and her two Israeli friends are kidnapped by ISIS terrorists, who threaten them with death unless the Israeli government agrees to release twelve ISIS detainees and the Norwegian government agrees to release another ISIS detainee from prison in Norway. Pia's mother, a Norwegian diplomat, travels to the Middle East, relying on old friends — and a long-kept secret — to help free her daughter.

Release
The girl from Oslo was released on Netflix on 8 April 2021.

Cast
 Anneke von der Lippe as Alex, Pia's mother
 Amos Tamam as Arik, a member of the Israeli  government with a personal history with Alex
 Raida Adon as Layla, another old friend of Alex with connections to the Hamas
 Andrea Berntzen as Pia, Alex's daughter who's abducted by ISIS
 Daniel Litman as Nadav, an Israeli man abducted along with Pia and his little sister Noa
 Shira Yosef as Noa, an Israeli girl abducted along with Pia and her big brother Nadav
 Anders T Anderseen as Karl, Alex's husband, a lawyer
 Vered Feldman as Anat, mother of Nadav and Noa
 Shadi Mar'i as Yusuf, Layla's son and one of Pia's abductors
 Rotem Abuhab as Dana, Arik's wife
 Jameel Khoury as Bashir, member of the Hamas
 Abhin Galeya as Abu Salim, a terrorist being held prisoner in Norway
 Hisham Sulliman as Ali
 Reut Portugal as Bat-El

References

External links
 

2021 Israeli television series debuts
Israeli action television series
Terrorism in television
Thriller television series